Abagi 'Abi' Bienose Ekoku (born 13 April 1966) is a former track and field athlete in both discus and shot put, as well as a former professional rugby league footballer.

Sporting career

Athletics
Ekoku represented Great Britain at the European Athletics Championships and was AAA’s National Champion in the Discus held in Sheffield in 1992 and UK Champion in the early 1990s. He represented England in the discus and shot put event, at the 1990 Commonwealth Games in Auckland, New Zealand.

Rugby league
He started his rugby league career with the London Crusaders, playing on a part-time basis whilst also lecturing in further education. He was signed by Halifax in July 1995, and played in the inaugural Super League season with the club. He joined the Bradford Bulls in 1997, helping the club win the Super League that year, and also played in the 1997 Challenge Cup against St. Helens at Wembley.

Ekoku announced his retirement from playing in 1998, and became chairman of the Rugby League Players' Association. He quit this post in 1999, and had a brief spell as chief executive at the Keighley Cougars before being appointed by the Bradford Bulls in a similar role. Ekoku was chief executive at Bradford Bulls from 2000 to 2003 - a period in which the club won the Super League, Challenge Cup and World Club Championship.

Ekoku returned to the game in 2005 as an anti-doping tutor before being appointed team manager for Great Britain in 2006. He stepped down from this role at the end of 2007.

Personal life
Ekoku's brother Efan is a former professional footballer who represented the Nigeria national football team, and as of 2011 is a football pundit with ESPN.

References

External links 
 
 

1966 births
Living people
Athletes (track and field) at the 1990 Commonwealth Games
Bradford Bulls players
British rugby league administrators
Commonwealth Games competitors for England
English male discus throwers
English male shot putters
English people of Nigerian descent
English rugby league players
Halifax R.L.F.C. players
London Broncos players
People educated at Liverpool College
Rugby league centres
Rugby league players from London
Rugby league wingers